Kathy is an American late-night talk show hosted by Kathy Griffin. The show debuted on April 19, 2012 at 10:00 p.m. on Bravo and aired every Thursday. The show was renewed for a second season, which started airing on January 10, 2013 as started to air Live at 10:00PM on Bravo, which was later changed to 11:30PM in mid-season.

On April 6, 2013, Bravo announced the cancellation of Kathy after two seasons.

Format
The show relies on Kathy Griffin's stand-up in the first part of the program.  Kathy's mother Maggie Griffin, and Kathy's assistant Tiffany Rinehart, both seated in the front row of the audience, are then introduced.  The main parts of the show feature a panel of "civilians" (random people, staff, or friends) and sometimes celebrities, chatting about hot issues of the week. The next part of the show is a pre-recorded segment involving comedic antics Kathy has done during the week.  Finally, Maggie gives her opinions on topics and the night's events in a segment called "Maggie Tucks Us In".

In season 2, the set of the show was re-decorated.  It was revealed that the studio of the show, Studio 58, used to be the studio of The Late Late Show with Craig Ferguson before it moved to Studio 56.  Also, the panelists consist mostly of celebrities rather than "civilians".  The segment "Maggie Tucks Us In" has been cut; however, Maggie Griffin, along with Rinehart is still seated in the audience each episode and Kathy would occasionally chat with them.

Episodes

Series overview

Season 1 (2012)

Season 2 (2013)

See also

 Kathy Griffin: My Life on the D-List
 List of Kathy Griffin stand-up specials
 List of late-night American network TV programs
 List of programs broadcast by Bravo

References

External links
 
 

2010s American late-night television series
2012 American television series debuts
2013 American television series endings
2010s American television talk shows
English-language television shows
Bravo (American TV network) original programming
Television shows set in Los Angeles
Television series by Embassy Row (production company)
Television series by Sony Pictures Television
Kathy Griffin